Koop Dairy is a Turkish Cypriot dairy products company located in Nicosia, Cyprus.

History
KOOP, was founded by 21 farmers in a village near Nicosia in 1958 under the name of Dairy Products Company. Company moved to its current headquarters in Ortakoy in 1962.

The company was purchased by the Cooperative Central Bank (Koop Bank) in 1968. After the purchase name of the company changed to its current name, Koop Süt.

Products
During the first few years of production, the company was producing using only sheep milk. Company's main operational fields are dairy products and fruit juices. Currently the company produces the following products:
Pasteurized milk
Halloumi
Cheese
Sunflower oil
Corn oil
Ice cream
Olive oil 
Legumes

References

External links
Official website
KOOP Bank

Dairy products companies
Food and drink companies of Cyprus
Food and drink companies established in 1958
1958 establishments in Cyprus
Companies based in Nicosia
Cypriot brands